Kwanzaa is an annual celebration of African-American culture from December 26 to January 1, culminating in a communal feast called Karamu, usually on the sixth day.  It was created by activist Maulana Karenga, based on African harvest festival traditions from various parts of West and Southeast Africa. Kwanzaa was first celebrated in 1966. A 2015 survey found that 1.9% of those polled planned to celebrate Kwanzaa – about six million people in the United States.

History and etymology
American Maulana Karenga created Kwanzaa in 1966 during the aftermath of the Watts riots as a specifically African-American holiday. Karenga said his goal was to "give blacks an alternative to the existing holiday of Christmas and give blacks an opportunity to celebrate themselves and their history, rather than simply imitate the practice of the dominant society." For Karenga, a major figure in the Black Power movement of the 1960s and 1970s, the creation of such holidays also underscored the essential premise that "you must have a cultural revolution before the violent revolution. The cultural revolution gives identity, purpose, and direction."

According to Karenga, the name Kwanzaa derives from the Swahili phrase matunda ya kwanza, meaning "first fruits". First fruits festivals exist in Southern Africa, celebrated in December/January with the southern solstice, and Karenga was partly inspired by an account he read of the Zulu festival Umkhosi Wokweshwama. It was decided to spell the holiday's name with an additional "a" so that it would have a symbolic seven letters.

During the early years of Kwanzaa, Karenga said it was meant to be an alternative to Christmas. He believed Jesus was psychotic and Christianity was a "White" religion that Black people should shun. As Kwanzaa gained mainstream adherents, Karenga altered his position so practicing Christians would not be alienated, stating in the 1997 book Kwanzaa: A Celebration of Family, Community, and Culture that "Kwanzaa was not created to give people an alternative to their own religion or religious holiday." Many African Americans who celebrate Kwanzaa do so in addition to observing Christmas.

After its initial creation in California, Kwanzaa spread outside the United States. In December 2022, Reverend Al Sharpton, Mayor Eric Adams, businessman Robert F. Smith, Reverend Conrad Tillard, Rabbi Shmuley Boteach, and Elisha Wiesel joined to celebrate Kwanzaa and Hanukkah together at Carnegie Hall.

Nguzo Saba (The Seven Principles)

Kwanzaa celebrates what its founder called the seven principles of Kwanzaa, or Nguzo Saba (originally Nguzu Saba – the seven principles of African Heritage). They were developed in 1965, a year before Kwanzaa itself. These seven principles are all Swahili words, and together comprise the Kawaida or "common" philosophy, a synthesis of nationalist, pan-Africanist, and socialist values. 

Each of the seven days of Kwanzaa is dedicated to one of the principles, as follows:

 Umoja (Unity): To strive for and to maintain unity in the family, community, nation, and race.
 Kujichagulia (Self-determination): To define and name ourselves, as well as to create and speak for ourselves.
 Ujima (Collective work and responsibility): To build and maintain our community together and make our brothers' and sisters' problems our problems and to solve them together.
 Ujamaa (Cooperative economics): To build and maintain our own stores, shops, and other businesses and to profit from them together.
 Nia (Purpose): To make our collective vocation the building and developing of our community in order to restore our people to their traditional greatness.
 Kuumba (Creativity): To do always as much as we can, in the way we can, in order to leave our community more beautiful and beneficial than we inherited it.
 Imani (Faith): To believe with all our hearts in our people, our parents, our teachers, our leaders, and the righteousness and victory of our struggle.

Symbols

Kwanzaa celebratory symbols include a mat (Mkeka) on which other symbols are placed: 

 a Kinara (candle holder for seven candlesticks)
 Mishumaa Saba (seven candles)
 mazao (crops)
 Mahindi (corn), to represent the children celebrating (and corn may be part of the holiday meal).
 a Kikombe cha Umoja (unity cup) for commemorating and giving shukrani (thanks) to African Ancestors
 Zawadi (gifts). 

Supplemental representations include a Nguzo Saba poster, the black, red, and green bendera (flag), and African books and artworks—all to represent values and concepts reflective of African culture and contribution to community building and reinforcement.

Observances

Families celebrating Kwanzaa decorate their households with objects of art, colorful African cloth such as kente, especially the wearing of kaftans by women, and fresh fruits that represent African idealism. It is customary to include children in Kwanzaa ceremonies and to give respect and gratitude to ancestors. Libations are shared, generally with a common chalice, Kikombe cha Umoja, passed around to all celebrants. Non-African Americans also celebrate Kwanzaa. "Joyous Kwanzaa" may be used as a greeting during the holiday.

A Kwanzaa ceremony may include drumming and musical selections, libations, a reading of the African Pledge and the Principles of Blackness, reflection on the Pan-African colors, a discussion of the African principle of the day or a chapter in African history, a candle-lighting ritual, artistic performance, and, finally, a feast of faith (Karamu Ya Imani). The greeting for each day of Kwanzaa is Habari Gani?, which is Swahili for "How are you?"

At first, observers of Kwanzaa avoided the mixing of the holiday or its symbols, values, and practice with other holidays, as doing so would violate the principle of kujichagulia (self-determination) and thus violate the integrity of the holiday, which is partially intended as a reclamation of important African values. Today, some African American families celebrate Kwanzaa along with Christmas and New Year.

Cultural exhibitions include the Spirit of Kwanzaa, an annual celebration held at the John F. Kennedy Center for the Performing Arts featuring interpretive dance, African dance, song and poetry.

Karamu 
A Karamu Ya Imani (Feast of Faith) is a feast that typically takes place on December 31, the sixth day of the Kwanzaa period. The Karamu feast was developed in Chicago during a 1971 citywide movement of Pan-African organizations. It was proposed by Hannibal Afrik of Shule ya Watoto as a communitywide promotional and educational campaign. The initial Karamu Ya Imani occurred on January 1, 1973 at a 200-person gathering at the Ridgeland club.

In 1992, the National Black United Front of Chicago held one of the largest Karamu Ya Imani celebrations in the country. It included dancing, a youth ensemble and a keynote speech by NBUF and prominent black nationalist leader Conrad Worrill.

The celebration includes the following practices:

 Kukaribisha (Welcoming)
 Kuumba (Remembering)
 Kuchunguza Tena Na Kutoa Ahadi Tena (Reassessment and Recommitment)
 Kushangilia (Rejoicing)
 Tamshi la Tambiko (Libation Statement)
 Tamshi la Tutaonana (The Farewell Statement)

Adherence
The popularity of celebration of Kwanzaa has declined with the waning of the popularity of the black separatist movement. Kwanzaa observation has declined in both community and commercial contexts. University of Minnesota Professor Keith Mayes did not report exact figures, noting that it is also difficult to determine these for the three other main African-American holidays, which he names as Martin Luther King Jr. Day, Malcolm X Day, and Juneteenth. Mayes added that white institutions now also celebrate it.

The National Retail Federation has sponsored a marketing survey on winter holidays since 2004, and in 2015 found that 1.9% of those polled planned to celebrate Kwanzaa – about six million people in the United States.

Starting in the 1990s, the holiday became increasingly commercialized, with the first Hallmark card being sold in 1992. Some have expressed concern about this potentially damaging the holiday's values.

Recognition
The first Kwanzaa stamp, designed by Synthia Saint James, was issued by the United States Post Office in 1997, and in the same year Bill Clinton gave the first presidential declaration marking the holiday. Subsequent presidents George W. Bush, Barack Obama, Donald Trump, and Joe Biden also issued greetings to celebrate Kwanzaa.

Maya Angelou narrated a 2008 documentary film about Kwanzaa, The Black Candle, written and directed by M. K. Asante and featuring Chuck D.

Practice outside the United States
Other countries that celebrate Kwanzaa include Great Britain, Jamaica, France, Canada, and Brazil.

In Canada it is celebrated in provinces including Saskatchewan and Ontario. Kwanzaa week was first declared in Toronto in 2018. There are local chapters that emerged in the 2010s in provinces like British Columbia, where there are much smaller groups of the diaspora, founding members may be immigrants from countries like Uganda.

See also

 American holidays
 Dashiki – a shirt or suit worn during Kwanzaa and other occasions

References

Further reading

External links
 
 
 The Black Candle: a Kwanzaa film narrated by Maya Angelou
 Why Kwanzaa was created by Karenga 
 The History Channel: Kwanzaa
  Interview: Karenga discusses the evolution of the holiday and its meaning.

 
1966 establishments in the United States
African-American culture
Black Power
December observances
January observances
Recurring events established in 1966
Kwanzaa
Public holidays in the United States
Swahili words and phrases